The Carstensz Glacier is near the peak of Puncak Jaya (sometimes called Mount Carstensz or the Carstensz Pyramid) which is a mountain in the Sudirman Range of the island of New Guinea, territorially the eastern highlands of Central Papua, Indonesia.

The glacier is named after the 17th century Dutch explorer Jan Carstenszoon, commonly known as Jan Carstensz.

Background
Research presented in 2004 of IKONOS satellite imagery of the New Guinean glaciers indicated that in the two years from 2000 to 2002, the Carstensz Glacier had lost a further 6.8% of its surface area. At that rate, the remaining glaciers in the immediate region near Puncak Jaya were expected to last only to the year 2015. A 2019 study predicted their disappearance within a decade.
 
The remaining remnant glaciers on Punkak Jaya were once part of an icecap that developed approximately 5,000 years ago. At least one previous icecap also existed in the region between 15,000 and 7,000 years ago, when it also apparently melted away and disappeared.

Gallery

See also
Retreat of glaciers since 1850
List of glaciers

References

Glaciers of Western New Guinea
Geography of Central Papua